Ken Rosewall defeated Tony Roche in the final, 2–6, 6–4, 7–6(5–2), 6–3 to win the men's singles tennis title at the 1970 US Open.

Rod Laver was the defending champion, but lost in the fourth round to Dennis Ralston.

Seeds
The seeded players are listed below. Ken Rosewall is the champion; others show the round in which they were eliminated.

  Rod Laver, (fourth round)
  John Newcombe, (semifinals)
  Ken Rosewall, (champion)
  Tony Roche, (finals)
  Roy Emerson, (fourth round)
  Andrés Gimeno, (first round)
  Arthur Ashe, (quarterfinals)
  Roger Taylor, (third round)
  Tom Okker, (fourth round)
  Cliff Richey, (semifinals)
  Stan Smith, (quarterfinals)
  Cliff Drysdale, (second round)
 -
  Richard Pancho Gonzales, (third round)
  Fred Stolle, (third round)
  Clark Graebner, (fourth round)
  Marty Riessen, (first round)
  Nikola Pilić, (fourth round)
  Dennis Ralston, (quarterfinals)
  Bob Hewitt, (second round)

Draw

Key
 Q = Qualifier
 WC = Wild card
 LL = Lucky loser
 r = Retired

Final eight

Section 1

Section 2

Section 3

Section 4

Section 5

Section 6

Section 7

Section 8

References

External links
 Association of Tennis Professionals (ATP) – 1970 US Open Men's Singles draw
1970 US Open – Men's draws and results at the International Tennis Federation

US Open (tennis) by year – Men's singles
M